Hitchcock is a town in Blaine County, Oklahoma, United States. The population was 121 at the 2010 census.

Geography
Hitchcock is located at  (35.967527, -98.349279) along Oklahoma State Highway 8.

Demographics

As of the census of 2000, there were 141 people, 51 households, and 39 families residing in the town. There were 63 housing units at an average density of 415.4 per square mile (162.2/km2). The racial makeup of the town was 90.78% White, 6.38% Native American, 0.71% from other races, and 2.13% from two or more races. Hispanic or Latino of any race were 0.71% of the population.

There were 51 households, out of which 41.2% had children under the age of 18 living with them, 58.8% were married couples living together, 7.8% had a female householder with no husband present, and 23.5% were non-families. 23.5% of all households were made up of individuals, and 9.8% had someone living alone who was 65 years of age or older. The average household size was 2.76 and the average family size was 3.26.

In the town, the population was spread out, with 33.3% under the age of 18, 7.8% from 18 to 24, 23.4% from 25 to 44, 22.0% from 45 to 64, and 13.5% who were 65 years of age or older. The median age was 36 years. For every 100 females, there were 107.4 males. For every 100 females age 18 and over, there were 91.8 males.

The median income for a household in the town was $28,750, and the median income for a family was $36,250. Males had a median income of $26,875 versus $19,750 for females. The per capita income for the town was $10,015. There were 25.7% of families and 31.3% of the population living below the poverty line, including 35.5% of under eighteens and 7.7% of those over 64.

References

Towns in Blaine County, Oklahoma
Towns in Oklahoma